Poplin is an extinct town in Stoddard County, in the U.S. state of Missouri.

A post office called Poplin was established in 1884, and remained in operation until 1886. The community has the name of G. L. Poplin.

References

Ghost towns in Missouri
Former populated places in Stoddard County, Missouri
1884 establishments in Missouri